Pillwein is a surname. Notable people with the surname include:

Heidi Pillwein, Austrian slalom canoeist
Rudolf Pillwein, Austrian slalom canoeist

German-language surnames